Stephen Jaffe (born December 30, 1954, in Washington, D.C.) is an American composer of contemporary classical music. He lives in Durham, North Carolina, United States, and serves on the music faculty of Duke University, where he holds the post of Mary and James H. Semans Professor of Music Composition; his colleagues there include composers Scott Lindroth, John Supko, and Anthony Kelley. Jaffe graduated summa cum laude from the University of Pennsylvania in 1977; he received a master's degree the following year from the same institution. During his time in Pennsylvania, he studied with George Crumb, George Rochberg, and Richard Wernick.

Jaffe's music has been performed across the United States, Europe, and China (including the Nottingham, Tanglewood, and Oregon Bach Festivals) by ensembles including the National Symphony Orchestra, the R.A.I. of Rome, the North Carolina Symphony, the San Francisco Symphony, the New Jersey Symphony Orchestra, the Miami String Quartet, and the Ciompi Quartet. He has received awards and commissions, and recordings of his works are available, including a three-volume retrospective of his work The Music of Stephen Jaffe from Bridge Records.

Jaffe's notable students include Jeremy Beck, Dorothy Hindman, Penka Kouneva, Caroline Mallonée, Carl Schimmel, Amy Scurria, and Nathaniel Stookey.

Awards and recognition
 Koussevitsky International Recording Award (KIRA) from the Musicians Club of New York (November 2006) – for Concerto for Violin and Orchestra
 Composer of the Year from the Classical Recording Society (November 2005)
 Aaron Copland Foundation for Music (2002) – for Concerto for Violin and Orchestra and Chamber Concerto ("Singing Figures")
 Howard Foundation Fellowship from Brown University (1996)
 American Academy and Institute of Arts and Letters Lifetime Achievement Prize (May 1993)
 Best Newly Published Music Citation from the National Flute Association (1991) – for Three Figures and a Ground
 Kennedy Center Friedheim Award (May 1991) – for First Quartet, recorded by the Ciompi Quartet
 Brandeis University Creative Arts Citation (May 1989)
 Guggenheim Fellowship (May 1984)
 Composer Fellowship from the National Endowment for the Arts (1981)
 Rome Prize administered by the American Academy in Rome (1980)
 Joseph H. Bearns Prize for Four Nocturnes (1976)
 Student Composer Award from BMI (1975) – for the symphony Three Lives
 Premier Medaille d’harmonie from the Conservatoire de Musique in Geneva (May 1972)

Major works
 Poetry of the Piedmont (2006) for orchestra – commissioned by North Carolina Symphony
 String Quartet No. 2 (Sylvan and Aeolian Figures) (2005) – written for the Miami String Quartet, commissioned by the Philadelphia Chamber Music Society
 Concerto for Violoncello and Orchestra (2004) – premiered by the National Symphony Orchestra under Leonard Slatkin, with soloist David Hardy
 Designs (2002) for flute, guitar and percussion – premiered at the National Arts Center of Taiwan, 2002
 Homage to the Breath: Instrumental and Vocal Meditations for Mezzo-soprano and Ten Instruments (2001) – featuring a text by Thich Nhat Hanh, premiered at the Hirshhorn Museum of Art in Washington, DC
 Concerto for Violin and Orchestra (2000) – premiered by soloist Nicholas Kitchen with the Greensboro Symphony Orchestra
 Songs of Turning (1996) for chorus and orchestra
 Chamber Concerto ("Singing Figures") (1996) for solo oboe and chamber ensemble – recorded by Speculum Musicae
 The Reassurance (1995) – contribution to the AIDS Quilt Songbook
 First Quartet (1991) – commissioned and premiered by the Ciompi Quartet
 Three Figures and a Ground (1989) for flute and piano
 Rhythm of the Running Plough (1985)

References
 
 "Language of Music Is in His Composition" by Thomas May for The Washington Post
 "Composer's life a classic tale of following one's star" by Vicki Hyman for News Observer website
 Profile on the Kennedy Center site
 Profile (containing Jaffe's residency statement) at the Atlantic Center for the Arts

External links
 Jaffe's faculty page on Duke University's website
 Profile on Duke University's website
Stephen Jaffe's page at Theodore Presser Company
 Stephen Jaffe profile at Bridge Records Management
 2009 Concert series at The Walden School with Jaffe as moderator and composer-in-residence
 American Works for String Quartet: Copland/Ward/Jaffe Program notes at DRAM website

Living people
American male classical composers
American classical composers
20th-century classical composers
21st-century classical composers
Duke University faculty
1954 births
Musicians from Washington, D.C.
University of Pennsylvania alumni
Pupils of George Crumb
21st-century American composers
20th-century American composers
20th-century American male musicians
21st-century American male musicians
Members of the American Academy of Arts and Letters